Oroso is a municipality of northwestern Spain in the province of A Coruña, in the autonomous community of Galicia. It belongs to the comarca of Ordes.

References

Municipalities in the Province of A Coruña